William Beanes (January 24, 1749 – October 12, 1828) was an American physician who was involved in the events surrounding the writing of the national anthem of the United States. Beanes was a Maryland resident, and upon the British invasion of Maryland during the War of 1812 offered British commanders the use of his home. However, Beanes arrested British deserters who had taken to ransacking local farms in search of food, an act which led to his arrest and detention by the British.

Upon news of his arrest become known, a group of Americans led by lawyer Francis Scott Key visited the British to negotiate his release. Upon receiving confirmation of the good character of Beanes, the British released him. During their return home, the group was made to wait in a boat in the Chesapeake Bay at Baltimore for the outcome of a battle at nearby Fort McHenry. The American victory inspired Key to pen Defence of Fort M’Henry about the battle and its outcome. That poem ultimately became the national anthem of the United States, "The Star-Spangled Banner".

Early life and education

The first Beanes family member in America was Christopher Beanes, a Scotsman who immigrated to the colony of Maryland in 1671. He married Ann Brooke. Their second child was named William, the first generation born in America. He married Elizabeth and their first child was also named William. This William married Mary Bowie. They had a son named William, who is the subject of this biography. He was born near Croome in Prince George's County, Maryland on January 24, 1749. Little is known of his childhood except that he was of Scottish descent. Throughout his life he spoke with a pronounced Scottish accent.

Beanes' parents were wealthy and owned large parcels of land in Prince George's County. As a result, Beanes grew up in an affluent environment of luxury. He may have received his basic education from a local public school and further medical education from a tutor. It is known that he obtained his initial medical education from one of the experienced medical practitioners in the town where he lived as there was no medical college in America at the time. Beanes began to practice medicine when he felt he was educated enough and qualified to do so.

Marriage and later life
Beanes married Sarah Hawkins Hanson on November 25, 1773. She was the niece of John Hanson, (1721–1783), later of Frederick, Maryland. Hanson became the first president of the Confederation Congress of the United States and it has been argued that he was the first President of the United States.

Politics and career
Beanes supported Boston's position in the resistance to the Coercive Acts of excessive governing by the British. He was one of the committee of Prince Georgians who put into effect in the thirteen American colonies the Declaration and Resolves of the First Continental Congress. He offered his medical services at the first General Hospital in Philadelphia after the Battles of Lexington and Concord. There he also attended to soldiers wounded at the Battle of Brandywine, the Battle of Long Island, and during the encampment at Valley Forge.

Beanes bought land just outside Upper Marlboro, Maryland, in 1779, where he built a house and began practicing medicine. He also farmed there and owned a local grist mill. In the later 18th century, Beanes was a respected medical doctor and distinguished scientist with an excellent reputation. In 1799, he was a founder of the Medical and Chirurgical (Surgical) Faculty of Maryland—today known as The Maryland State Medical Society (MedChi)—with John Archer and his son Thomas Archer.

War of 1812
Beanes played a part during the War of 1812. In the summer of 1814, a British fleet of ships and barges in the Chesapeake Bay sailed up the Patuxent River, landing several regiments of soldiers near Benedict, Maryland, and fighting the Battle of St. Jerome Creek. The town was mostly deserted except for Beanes, one of its most prominent citizens. He offered British General Robert Ross and Royal Navy Admiral Sir George Cockburn use of his house as their headquarters from August 22 until the afternoon of August 23. This led Ross to believe Beanes was sympathetic towards the British. There was also no resistance to them in town, which reinforced Ross' newfound belief.

After a clear British victory, they continued to Washington and burned most of the city's public buildings, including the White House, the Capitol building, the Navy Yard, and other Federal buildings and structures in retaliation for the earlier American Burning of York, the capital of Upper Canada (also known as Toronto, capital of the Province of Ontario) the year before. On the return trip to their ships, they stopped briefly again at Upper Marlboro. Some British deserters ransacked several small farms in the area in search of food. Robert Bowie, the 11th Governor of Maryland, who was a farmer and owned farmland in the area, decided to take matters into his own hands and do something about the ransacking. He got help from Beanes who convinced Dr. William Hill and Philip Weems to participate. They arrested a few deserters and took them to the Prince George's County jail. One escaped and returned back to the British ships in southern Maryland and told Ross about the arrests.

Ross was furious at thinking he was misled by Beanes' earlier hospitality and that it had perhaps just been a trick for spying on British activities. The marauders may have lied and accused Beanes of eagerness to spy, so Ross immediately ordered his arrest along with Bowie and four others. Beanes, Bowie, Hill and Weems were seized shortly after midnight the following day. After the soldiers had turned them over, Ross and Cockburn soon released Bowie and the others since it was determined after interrogation they were not spies. However, Beanes was taken back to the H.M.S. Tonnant as a possible spy. Brigadier General William H. Winder, (1775–1824), commander of the Ninth Military District in the area, in a letter dated August 31 protested the action:

"Star-Spangled Banner" 
Friends of Beanes went to Francis Scott Key, a lawyer in Georgetown, (and later in Frederick, Maryland), for help to obtain the release of the elderly doctor. Key got permission from President James Madison, who also sent John Stuart Skinner the U.S. Prisoner Exchange Agent for the region, to do so. They took one of Skinner's flag of truce vessels, a Chesapeake Bay cartel, the Minden, and set out to locate the British fleet in the Chesapeake Bay. Skinner and Key reached the British flagship of Vice Admiral Sir Alexander Cochrane. They met with Ross, who refused to release Beanes. Skinner knew Beanes had a good reputation, so collected letters from wounded British soldiers left behind after the Battle of Bladensburg detailing how well the Americans had treated them and the excellent medical treatment provided by Beanes. Skinner gave Ross the letters.

Ross reconsidered and released Beanes. Skinner, Key and Beanes were allowed return to the Minden. The trio had learned too much about British forces and their plans to attack on Baltimore to be allowed to go free. The Minden was tied to a British ship in the Chesapeake Bay and guarded by British soldiers until after the battle. It began the morning of September 13, 1814, and the three men watched it from their ship. There was a large flag at Fort McHenry visible to them, however, smoke from British gunfire, cannons, Congreve rockets and nightfall eventually obscured it from their view.

When morning came on September 14, they saw the flag was still flying. The British had not taken Fort McHenry, had broken off the attack during the night, and were retreating. The British released Skinner, Key, and Beanes, who arrived in Baltimore on September 16. Key was inspired to write a poem about the event on the back of a letter which ultimately became the "Star-Spangled Banner". Beanes was the incidental cause leading Key to write the poem.

Alternative viewpoints
Some historians think the name of the sloop/cartel that Key, Skinner and Beanes were on when they viewed the Battle of Baltimore was The President. A letter dated "Washington, 1856" from Chief Justice R. B. Taney, brother-in-law of Francis Scott Key, to Judge Joseph Hopper Nicholson states that Key, Skinner and Beanes were transferred from the British vessel Surprise to their own unnamed "flag of truce" vessel usually employed as a cartel. They then viewed the battle and Key immediately jotted down the poem's lines before being released by the British to return to land. Still another report about a Mrs. George H. Pendleton (daughter of Key) says Key wrote the poem on September 14, from an unnamed American vessel but not the British vessel Surprise. Still other reports say the ship HMS Minden was not involved in the Battle of Baltimore but was as far away as Java.

The Boston Daily Globe reports in 1886:

A letter by one of Key's brothers-in-law, a Judge Taney, says in part as reported by the Pennsylvania Magazine 1898 pp. 22–3:

The letter goes on to say:

According to the Maryland Historical Society, upon Beanes' release from the British, he, along with Skinner and Key, were put on the sloop Minden on or about September 8 to sail up Chesapeake Bay toward Baltimore. British soldiers guarded them as they sailed with a fleet of some forty vessels intending to attack Fort McHenry. The Minden had its sails removed and the British frigate Surprize towed it. The British fleet arrived at Baltimore between September 11 and 13. The battle of Fort McHenry began during the early morning hours of September 13. When Key saw the next morning that the flag was still flying after a fierce battle he was inspired on the Minden to write on the back of a letter the poem "To Anacreon in Heaven", which ultimately became the "Star-Spangled Banner".

Later life and death
Beanes spent the remainder of his life on Academy Hill in Upper Marlboro. He died there on October 12, 1828; his wife preceded him on July 15, 1822. They are buried at their home in the garden.

Footnotes

References

External links

1749 births
1828 deaths
18th-century American physicians
People from Prince George's County, Maryland
People from Maryland in the War of 1812
People from Upper Marlboro, Maryland